Jang Jae-in (Hangul: 장재인, born June 6, 1991), also known as Jang Jane, is a South Korean singer-songwriter known for her unique voice. Jang became well known after she finished third in the South Korean reality television series Superstar K 2 in 2010.

Life and career

Early life 
Jang was born in Gangjin-gun, Jeollanam-do, South Korea, on June 6, 1991. She began writing songs at 15. She was an outstanding student but chose to drop out of high school to pursue a music career. Her original first name was So-min, but she changed her name to Jaein (which means "talented person" in Korean). At 16, she moved to Seoul and spent time busking on the streets of Hongdae. After entering Howon University (music major), Jaein performed regularly in several live clubs in Hongdae., In 2020 her first studio albumThe Quest of Anxiety was released.

Career Beginnings: Superstar K2
In 2010, Jang appeared on Superstar K2, placing third. She led the online poll for four consecutive weeks before entering the Top 3 Week (in which she was eliminated) with second most online votes behind John Park.

In 2013, she was officially diagnosed with stress-related dystonia, she received medication and Pilates therapy.

Discography

Studio albums

Extended plays

Singles

Awards

Mnet Asian Music Awards 

|-
| 2011
| "장난감 병정들"
| Best New Female Artists
|

Seoul Music Awards 

|-
| 2016
| Jang Jae-in - Kill Me, Heal Me OST
| OST Award
|

References

External links

1991 births
Living people
Mystic Entertainment artists
South Korean women pop singers
South Korean rhythm and blues singers
South Korean singer-songwriters
South Korean pop guitarists
South Korean female idols
Superstar K participants
21st-century South Korean singers
21st-century South Korean women singers
21st-century guitarists
South Korean women singer-songwriters
21st-century women guitarists